Guarea corrugata is a species of plant in the family Meliaceae. It is endemic to Colombia.

References

corrugata
Endemic flora of Colombia
Endangered plants
Taxonomy articles created by Polbot